Newfound Gap (el. ) is a mountain pass located near the center of the Great Smoky Mountains National Park of the southern Appalachian Mountains in the United States of America. Situated along the border of Tennessee and North Carolina, the state line crosses the gap, as does Newfound Gap Road (which overlaps U.S. Route 441 through the park and ends at the park's boundaries near Gatlinburg, Tennessee and Cherokee, North Carolina). The Appalachian Trail also traverses the gap, as do a small number of other hiking trails.

Newfound Gap is also home to the Rockefeller Memorial, a popular destination within the national park and the site from where former U.S. President Franklin D. Roosevelt formally dedicated the park on September 2, 1940.

According to the National Weather Service, Newfound Gap has around 19 snowy days per year.

History
Prior to the development of the Great Smoky Mountains National Park, Newfound Gap was an undiscovered pass two miles east of what was long thought to be the lowest mountain pass over the Great Smoky Mountains, Indian Gap. Indian Gap Road, an unpaved, arduous trail frequented by traders, farmers, and even by the Confederate Army during the American Civil War, was completed in 1839 and named after the old Cherokee Indian trail that the road paralleled. Newfound Gap itself was not recognized as the lowest gap over the mountains until 1872, when Arnold Guyot measured many of the mountains in the area and determined the "Newfound Gap" to be a lower, more accessible mountain pass.

Climate

Newfound Gap Road
With the development of the Great Smoky Mountains National Park came the construction of a newer, more modern highway from Tennessee to North Carolina, completed in 1932 – this time crossing Newfound Gap, replacing the now-defunct Indian Gap Road. North of the park, it is now known as Great Smoky Mountains Parkway. The Gatlinburg Bypass, originally intended to be a part of the Foothills Parkway, extends out from the park to connect Newfound Gap Road south of town to the parkway north of town.

Despite its heavy winter snows, the pass is kept open all year, except during and just after winter storms. When closed, the snow route is a long detour around the east-northeast end of the park, using U.S. 321 and Interstate 40. The Tennessee side typically has heavier snow because of its north and northwestern exposure. Even when valley roads are clear and there is little snow in Gatlinburg (and almost none in Cherokee), Newfound Gap may have far deeper snow, and will be closed for several hours after significant snowfall ends. Additionally, being in a national park, Newfound Gap Road is only treated by snowplows and a gravel-sand mix, as no chemicals can be used for snow removal due to their harm to the environment.

The road was closed for days after the Great Blizzard of 1993, when  of snow fell, and snowdrifts piled up to twice that.

References

External links

Great Smoky Mountains National Park

Great Smoky Mountains National Park
Mountain passes of North Carolina
Mountain passes of Tennessee
Landforms of Sevier County, Tennessee
Landforms of Swain County, North Carolina
Transportation in Sevier County, Tennessee
Transportation in Swain County, North Carolina
U.S. Route 441